Ethiopia competed at the 1992 Summer Olympics in Barcelona, Spain. The nation returned to the Olympic Games after a 12 year absence, having boycotted the 1984 Summer Olympics in Los Angeles, United States and 1988 Summer Olympics in Seoul, South Korea. Twenty competitors, fourteen men and six women, took part in eleven events in two sports.

Medalists

Competitors
The following is the list of number of competitors in the Games.

Athletics

Men's 5.000 metres
Fita Bayissa
 Heat — 13:31.24
 Final — 13:13.03 (→  Bronze Medal)
Worku Bikila
 Heat — 13:32.93
 Final — 13:23.52 (→ 6th place)
Addis Abebe
 Heat — 13:40.76 (→ did not advance)

Men's 10.000 metres
Addis Abebe
 Heat — 28:15.76
 Final — 28:00.07 (→  Bronze Medal)
Fita Bayisa
 Heat — 28:23.55
 Final — 28:27.68 (→ 9th place)

Men's Marathon
 Tena Megere — 2:17.07 (→ 23rd place)
 Zerehune Gitaw — 2:28.25 (→ 61st place)
 Abebe Mekonnen — did not finish (→ no ranking)

Men's 20 km Walk
Shemisu Hasen — 1:32:39 (→ 25th place)

Women's 800 metres
Zewdie Hailemariam
 Heat — 2:03.85 (→ did not advance)

Women's 10.000 metres
Derartu Tulu
 Heat — 31:55.67
 Final — 31:06.02 (→  Gold Medal)
Moreda Tigist
 Heat — 32:14.42
 Final — 34:05.56 (→ 18th place)
Luchia Yeshak
 Qualifying Heat — 34:12.16 (→ did not advance)

Women's Marathon
 Addis Gezahegu — 2:58.27 (→ 30th place)

Cycling

Five male cyclists represented Ethiopia in 1992.

Men's road race
 Biruk Abebe
 Asmelash Geyesus
 Tekle Hailemikael

Men's team time trial
 Biruk Abebe
 Hailu Fana
 Asmelash Geyesus
 Daniel Tesfaye

References

External links
Official Olympic Reports
International Olympic Committee results database

Oly
Nations at the 1992 Summer Olympics
1992